Stanhopea pozoi is a species of orchid endemic to Colombia.

References

External links  

pozoi
Endemic orchids of Colombia